Pseudaclytia opponens is a moth in the subfamily Arctiinae. It was described by Francis Walker in 1864. It is found in Tefé, Brazil.

References

Moths described in 1864
Arctiinae